The Complete 1969 Recordings is the ninth major box set by rock band King Crimson. It features 26 discs worth of material spanning their first studio album, In the Court of the Crimson King.

The box set's new session material was remixed to stereo by David Singleton. It also features a new Dolby Atmos remix of the original album by Steven Wilson.

The box set includes 20 CDs worth of material with another 2 DVD's and 4 Blu-Ray Discs. The album also features a booklet of unseen photos from the recording sessions as well as memorabilia

Reception 
Writing for All About Jazz, John Kelmon loved the album especially highlighting the sound quality. He added in conclusion: "For those who wanted to understand just how remarkable King Crimson Mark I's many achievements were, and in such a short period of time, The Complete 1969 Recordings now comes as the absolutely best document."

Track listing

References 

2020 compilation albums
King Crimson compilation albums